The Ghana Women of Courage Award similar to the International Women of Courage Award, is an American award presented by the United States Department of State to Ghanaian women who have shown leadership, courage, resourcefulness, and willingness to sacrifice for others, especially in promoting women's rights in Ghana.

Award recipients by year

2017 

 Charlotte Osei

2019 

 Stella Saaka

2020 

 Lydia Sasu

See also

 List of awards honoring women

References

Awards honoring women
Courage awards